Housing & Commercial Bank FC is defunct South Korean semi-professional football club. The club played in the 1997 Korean FA Cup, where they reached the quarter finals.

Honours
 Korea Semi-Professional Football League :
 Champions (4): 1972s, 1972a, 1986s, 1998s
Runners-up (4): 1971s, 1984, 1990s, 1994a
 Korean National Football Championship (Former FA Cup):
Runners-up (1): 1994
 Korean President's Cup National Football Tournament :
 Champions (4): 1972, 1992, 1996, 1997, 1998
Runners-up (1): 1995

References

S
B
1969 establishments in South Korea
1998 disestablishments in South Korea
Financial services association football clubs in South Korea